Tun Dr. Abdul Daim bin Zainuddin (Jawi: عبدالدائم بن زين الدين; born 29 April 1938 in Alor Setar, Kedah) is a Malaysian politician, businessman and former Finance Minister of Malaysia from 1984 to 1991.

Early life
Daim is the youngest of thirteen siblings. His father was a clerk in the Kedah State Service and his mother a homemaker Zainuddin Affan & Hasimah Hassan. Daim received his early education at the Malay Primary School in Alor Setar and then later to the Special Malay Class at the Sultan Abdul Hamid College, an English-medium school.

He was encouraged by his mother to further his studies and his father wanted him to become a lawyer. His mother sold land to raise money for him to study law in England. Daim studied for eighteen months at Lincoln's Inn, London and was called to the English Bar in 1959 when he was 21 years old.

Early career
When he returned to Malaysia after his studies, he joined Pillai & Co. and later, the chambers of Shearn Delamore which was then the largest law firm in Kuala Lumpur. In 1961, he decided to move and work in Kota Bharu, Kelantan under Wan Mustaffa who was a legal adviser to the Pan-Malaysian Islamic Party (PMIP) which later became known as Parti Islam Se-Malaysia (PAS).  After his stint in Kota Bharu, he joined the Malaysian Civil Service as a Magistrate, and became the President of the Sessions Court in Johor and subsequently became Deputy Public Prosecutor in Ipoh, Perak.  He resigned from the service in 1965, returned to Kuala Lumpur and joined the law firm Allen & Gledhill for the next three years till his resignation in 1968 to start his own law practice of Daim & Gamany. In 1969, however, he decided to venture into business.

Business
His first business venture was in salt production, where he went to Thailand, Taiwan and Japan to study salt production, weather forecast and soil condition. During the start-up they proceeded to clear  of the coastal land of Kuala Selangor, but because the rain came unseasonably early just when the salt had begun to crystallise, they were almost bankrupted by it.

In 1971, he decided to venture into land and property development. Together with two other partners, he formed a company, Syarikat Maluri Sdn Bhd of which he held a 60% majority control. The company bought and developed Taman Bukit Maluri, Kepong and Daim became the first full-fledged Malay property developer in Kuala Lumpur. In 1971, Prime Minister Tun Abdul Razak introduced the New Economic Policy that was an ambitious and controversial socio-economic restructuring affirmative action program. The NEP targeted a 30% share of the economy for Bumiputera. Hence, being only a handful of Bumiputeras involved in this sector, Daim naturally gained advantages from the government over his Chinese counterparts.

His next venture was in plastics production. After he obtained a license however, another two licenses were issued and this instigated early and keen competition to Daim's fledgling company. Furthermore, the workers were incited to strike and eventually the venture proved to be another bankrupting business. Fortunately, his other downstream ventures which included the plastic packaging company, Daibochi and the snack food factory, Sedap Food flourished and were later listed on the Kuala Lumpur Stock Exchange (KLSE). He also invested in the Ports' downstream business with stevedoring, forwarding and low-loader licenses and had set up a manufacturing plant making steel and iron products such as manhole covers and telephone posts. The success of these ventures helped towards offsetting loans and borrowings of the failed venture. Daim bought a 30% equity interest in United Estates Projects (UEP) now known as Sime Darby–UEP (developer of Subang Jaya township) and went on picking up stakes in the share market, mostly strategic rather than controlling stakes.

Daim was willing to take risks and opportunities. When President François Mitterrand of France came into power and nationalised French banks, Daim knew that Malaysian banking regulations did not allow for government-owned banks to operate in Malaysia and therefore knew that Bank Indo-Suez will either have to close its operations in Malaysia or were to be sold-off. He wrote a letter to the head of the bank registering his interest in the event that they would want to sell. The bank decided to sell to Daim and in 1981 he became the owner of Indo-Suez (later renamed as the Malaysian-French Bank).  When the United Malayan Banking Corporation (then the 2nd largest bank in Malaysia) became available, he exchanged his majority stake in the Malaysian-French Bank for a smaller stake in this larger bank.

Political career
Apart from business, politics have always interested Daim. His earliest exposure was as a student in London whereby though not actively involved in politics, he shared his fellow students interests in the political issues of the day particularly independence and post-independence implications on the socio–economic and religious mosaic of pluralistic Malaysia.

His first encounter with real politics albeit covertly was when in 1966, as a lawyer with Allen & Gledhill, the firm was appointed by the Federal Government of Malaysia to act for the governor of Sarawak in a case against the chief minister of that state. Back in Kuala Lumpur, Daim was asked to attend a cabinet meeting where he briefed the cabinet members of the political situation in Sarawak and pressed upon the cabinet the need for emergency to be declared to avert a worsening of the situation caused by the demonstrations against the chief minister's minority government. Emergency was declared. However, the security risk persisted and the governor as advised by the central government suspended the Standing Orders of the House and called for a meeting of the Assembly using emergency powers. Daim assisted in drafting the statement of the governor that the assembly was to debate; the assembly met, the chief minister's government was voted out of office. Impressed by his legal skills and political knowledge, the prime minister offered Daim a seat in Sungai Petani in the 1974 general elections but Daim declined, choosing instead to establish his credentials in business.

Daim decided that he was financially comfortable enough to retire in 1977. His retirement plan then was to go back to school and so he enrolled at University of California Berkeley to pursue a course in urban planning. At around the same time, he enjoyed a close rapport with the then Deputy Prime Minister Mahathir Mohamad.

In 1978, Daim met Mahathir in Los Angeles and San Francisco, when Mahathir urged Daim to return to Malaysia and contest in the general election that year. At the same time, Daim was also offered the chairmanship of the Urban Development Authority (UDA) by the Public Enterprises Minister. However, he was not interested as he deemed it too big and widespread bureaucratic. Instead he suggested that the UDA should form a holding company and transfer all of its commercial property and commercial assets to it; only then would he agree to manage it. Hence, Peremba was established and Daim became its non-executive chairman with a team of young and bright hand-picked officers assisting him. In 1980, Daim was informed that the Prime Minister Tun Hussein Onn had appointed him as senator in the upper house of parliament.

1980s 
When Mahathir became prime minister in 1981, he sent Daim to the United States to deal with the problem posed by the US' General Services Administration (GSA) tin stockpile releases which caused the price of tin to tumble, thus adversely affecting the Malaysian tin industry, it being a major producer of tin. The talks went well and the GSA agreed to limit their stockpile releases to 3,000 tonnes a year for three years.

However, the event that truly launched Daim's political career was the day before nominations for the 1982 general elections, when Mahathir told Daim that he was to contest the Kuala Muda Parliamentary seat. Within the short span of the next two years, his rise in politics was meteoric as he was appointed as Minister of Finance in 1984. At that same time the burgeoning economy kept up its momentum despite the high rate of borrowing and spending to keep the economy healthy. The full impact of the world recession on Malaysia was only felt in 1985. Internally too, there were many abuses involving financial institutions brought about by lack of proper supervision and control. By the time he took over, Daim could not avert the scandals, crisis and failures. However, Daim set about implementing a strict code of monetary and financial management to prevent the economic issues from becoming terminal for the whole economy. He stopped the practice of borrowing to beef up funds for spending, he instead curtailed expenditure to suit income, he slashed the allocation for the public sector – upsetting many quarters. In the years 1987, 1988 and 1989, Malaysia paid off about RM6.8 billion of its foreign debts which was earlier than scheduled, a record repayment rate for developing nations. The Far Eastern Economic Review, which had made dire predictions about Malaysia's economy in 1986, admitted in its issue of 1 September 1988 that Daim's effective management style had contributed positively and tremendously to Malaysia's economic recovery.

During this time, he never lost his love for the banking industry and after he retired he started investing in small banks overseas in Europe and Africa.  As his business expanded, the banks needed to be organised under a bigger parent bank and he therefore acquired Hock Hua Bank (which he renamed International Bank of Malaysia Berhad) which was one of the smaller banks in Malaysia.  Again he had to dispose of his stake when he was reappointed Minister of Finance in 1998.  After his second retirement he is now again actively involved in the banking industry.

1990s to present 
Daim resigned as Finance Minister in March 1991, and the news caused a stir in Malaysia. He resigned as he felt he had improved the country's financial position. Further, the prime minister reiterated by saying that "Daim had agreed to take the post on condition that he stay only to help reorganize and improve the country's financial position. He said he had fulfilled this task and it was time I let him go." In accepting his resignation, the prime minister also welcomed his readiness to contribute his ideas to the nation. The prime minister recommended Daim for the "Tun" title – the highest honour in Malaysia. And so on 5 June 1991, the Yang di-Pertuan Agong Sultan Azlan Shah conferred on Daim the Seri Setia Mahkota award, which carries the title "Tun".

Prior to his resignation, in 1991, Daim's contribution was succinctly summed up as thus: “Despite having much of his tenure clouded in controversy, the outgoing finance minister has nonetheless earned the reputation as one of the country’s ablest economic architects, having steered Malaysia through recession into four straight years of high growth.” In another article, “Daim exits office having earned the distinction of being a hard-driving technocrat, who resisted pressure by rival ministers who wanted to alter fiscal policy for political expediency...”.

Daim implemented four broad strategic structural reforms during the 1986 to 1991 period namely the mobilisation of the private sector, active external policies, the supportive role of the private sector and the rehabilitation of the public enterprises. To this day, the tenets of his economic policies are held in high esteem and are continually pursued to either jump start or sustain the Malaysian economy. Daim was appointed economic advisor to the government, chairman of the Northern Growth Triangle, the Labuan Development Authority and the Langkawi Development Authority and also the Treasurer of the United Malays National Organisation (UMNO), the leading party in Malaysia's ruling coalition, Barisan Nasional (BN). He was also Malaysia's representative to the East Asean Growth Area (EAGA). Daim Zainuddin was recalled to public service during the Asian Financial Crisis.

On 5 May 2018, Daim was sacked from UMNO together with party veterans; Rafidah Aziz and Rais Yatim for supporting Mahathir Mohamad and the opposition, Pakatan Harapan (PH). Mahathir announced that Daim was appointed chief of the five-members in the Council of Eminent Persons (CEP), which served as advisors to the new government under PH after the coalition won the 2018 general elections. Daim declared the council which had held its final meeting on 17 August 2018, has ended its 100-day term as it has fulfilled the mandate given to it within the specified period.

In 2019 at the age of 81, worked on the thesis regarding the New Economic Policy for 11 years, where he obtained his Doctor of Philosophy (PhD) degree from Universiti Malaya (UM).

Election results

Honours

Honours of Malaysia
  : 
  Grand Commander of the Order of Loyalty to the Crown of Malaysia (SSM) – Tun (1991)
  :
  Knight Commander of the Order of Loyalty to Sultan Abdul Halim Mu'adzam Shah (DHMS) – Dato’ Paduka (1988)
  :
  Grand Knight of the Order of Sultan Ahmad Shah of Pahang (SSAP) – Dato’ Sri (1988)
  :
  Grand Commander of the Order of Malacca (DGSM) – Datuk Seri (2000)
  :
  Knight Grand Commander of the Order of the Crown of Selangor (SPMS) – Dato’ Seri (1997)

See also
 Kuala Kedah (federal constituency)
 Merbok (federal constituency)

References

External links
 Official website
 Malaysia.net

1938 births
Living people
People from Alor Setar
People from Kedah
Malaysian people of Malay descent
Malaysian Muslims
Malaysian businesspeople
Malaysian economists

20th-century Malaysian judges

Former Malaysian United Indigenous Party politicians
Former United Malays National Organisation politicians
Members of the Dewan Rakyat
Members of the Dewan Negara
Government ministers of Malaysia
Finance ministers of Malaysia
Members of Lincoln's Inn
University of Malaya alumni
University of California, Berkeley alumni
Knights Grand Commander of the Order of the Crown of Selangor
Grand Commanders of the Order of Loyalty to the Crown of Malaysia
20th-century Malaysian politicians
21st-century Malaysian politicians
People named in the Pandora Papers